The Rast & Gasser Model 1898 was a service revolver used by the Austro-Hungarian Army during World War I and various armies in World War II.

History 
180,000 copies were produced by the firm Leopold Gasser Waffenfabrik in Vienna from 1898 to 1912. Prior to the outbreak of the First World War, the M1898 was planned to be replaced in the Austro-Hungarian cavalry with the Roth–Steyr M1907, and in the infantry with the Steyr M1912.  However production of newer pistols was insufficient and the weapon remained in service. It was specially-issued to NCOs, officers, and also as a secondary weapons for machine-gunners. In some armies it was used up through the Second World War, including Italy and Yugoslavia. The manufacturing quality and the strength of the solid-frame design made it a reliable and consistent military weapon.

The M1898 was copied in Belgium by Manufacture d'Armes Liégeoise in the 7.62 Nagant caliber.

Operation
The Rast & Gassers featured some new elements of revolver design, as well as older elements already obsolete at the time of its manufacture. A solid-frame double-action revolver, it had a loading-gate through which individual cartridges were loaded and extracted by an extractor rod. The firing pin was located on a transfer piece on the frame of the revolver rather than the hammer, an advancement at the time. Its ammunition was similar to but not interchangeable with that of the 8mm French Ordnance.

The cylinder could be removed by pulling down on a spring loaded screw and withdrawing the axis pin/ejector rod.

Loading 
To load the M1898 the user must rotate the loading gate back, exposing the rear of the cylinder. Doing this disengages the hammer from the trigger, but the cylinder will still rotate if the trigger is squeezed. This feature makes loading much easier and faster. Cartridges are then inserted into the cylinder and the trigger squeezed top present the next empty chamber. After all the slots have been loaded, the loading-gate is closed by pushing it forward. The hammer is then rotated all the way back to the full-cocked position ready for firing.

To unload the M1898, the loading gate is rotated backwards to expose the back of the cylinder. The user then rotates the knurled handle of the ejector rod outwards, which can then be pushed backwards to punch out the spend casing from each cylinder chamber.

To remove the cylinder, the user must remove the cylinder arbor by pulling down on a spring loaded screw which nestles into a mortice on the  barrel. While holding the screw down, the user can then simply
pull the arbor forwards till it slips off of the frame. Then one must open the loading gate to allow the cylinder to fall out the right side of the frame.

Other Specifications
 Rifling: 4-groove right-hand twist

See also
Small Arms of WWI Primer 021: Austro-Hungarian Revolver M1898 Rast & Gasser covers the history of the gun, as well as disassembly and firing.

References

Sources
D. VENNER, Le Grand Livre des Armes, J. Grancher, 1979
COLLECTIF (spécialistes tchèques), Encyclopédie illustrée des Armes des 1ère et 2e Guerres mondiales, Gründ,2001

8 mm firearms
Military revolvers
Early revolvers
World War I Austro-Hungarian infantry weapons
Police weapons